On 29 March 2011, after Jhala Nath Khanal stepped down as the 35th Prime Minister of Nepal, Baburam Bhattarai was elected the new Prime Minister by the Parliament of Nepal securing the votes of smaller parties of southern Nepal. Following his election, Bhattarai set up a coalition cabinet consisting of his Communist Party of Nepal (Maoist Centre) as well the smaller parties Nepal Sadbhawana Party, Tarai-Madhesh Loktantrik Party, Nepal Sadbhavana Party (Anandidevi) and Madhesi Jana Adhikar Forum, Nepal.

As a way out of the political deadlock since the dissolution of the first Nepalese Constituent Assembly in 2012, he was replaced by Chief Justice Khil Raj Regmi as head of an interim government that was to hold elections by 21 June 2013.

Ministers

References

Government of Nepal
Cabinet of Nepal
2011 in Nepal
2011 establishments in Nepal
2013 disestablishments in Nepal